Jaime Daniel Quintana Leal (born 22 October 1967) is a Chilean politician.

He was President of the Senate of Chile.

References

External links
 

1967 births
Party for Democracy (Chile) politicians
Pontifical Catholic University of Chile alumni
Presidents of the Senate of Chile
Living people
Senators of the LV Legislative Period of the National Congress of Chile
Senators of the LVI Legislative Period of the National Congress of Chile